Thomas's pygmy jerboa (Salpingotus thomasi) is a species of rodent in the family Dipodidae. It is endemic to Afghanistan. Its natural habitat is temperate desert. This species is known only from the type specimen and lately is synonymized with Baluchistan pygmy jerboa (Salpingotulus michaelis) due to conspecifity.

References

External links 

Salpingotus
Mammals of Afghanistan
Endemic fauna of Afghanistan
Taxonomy articles created by Polbot
Mammals described in 1928
Taxobox binomials not recognized by IUCN